Chauliognathus lugubris, the plague soldier beetle, green soldier beetle or banana bug, is a species of soldier beetle (Cantharidae) native to Australia. The abdomen is yellow-orange but is mostly obscured by the metallic olive green elytra.

Plague soldier beetles are most common in spring and early summer, and have an adult lifespan of 2-3 months. They are most commonly found in the temperate region of southeast Australia, and are occasionally found in parts of the southwest.

The beetles often swarm in large, localised groups around flora such as shrubs and trees, primarily to mate. These swarms can include hundreds of thousands of beetles.

External links 
 Sightings on Canberra Nature Map

References

Cantharidae
Beetles described in 1801
Endemic fauna of Australia